The Encyclopedia of Statistical Sciences is an encyclopaedia of statistics published by John Wiley & Sons.

The first edition, in nine volumes, was published in 1982; it was edited by Norman Lloyd Johnson and Samuel Kotz.  The second edition, in 16 volumes, was published in 2006; the senior editor was Samuel Kotz.

See also
International Encyclopedia of Statistical Science

References

External links 
 Wiley page

Statistical Sciences
Statistics books